The article constitutes most of notable aircraft produced by India. Since its independence, India has designed and produced a number of civilian and military aircraft. State-owned Hindustan Aeronautics Limited (HAL) remains the largest manufacturer of aircraft in country.

Trainers

Civilian

Rotorcraft

Fixed wing

Military

Rotorcraft

Fixed Wing

Unmanned aerial vehicles

Ultralight 
 X-Air
 X-Air Hanuman
 Raj Hamsa Voyager
 Raj Hamsa Clipper

See also 
 Indian Air Force
 Aviation in India
 Civil aviation in India
 Defence industry of India

Notes and References

Notes

References

Bibliography 

 
 
  
 

Taylor, M.J.H. (ed,). Brassey's World Aircraft Systems Directory 1999/2000 Edition. London: Brassey's, 1999. 
 
 

 
 

India
Aircraft